The 2005 World Weightlifting Championships were held in Doha, Qatar from 9 November to 17 November. The men's +105 kilograms division was staged on 17 November 2005.

Schedule

Medalists

Records

Results

References
Weightlifting World Championships Seniors Statistics, Page 58 
Results 

2005 World Weightlifting Championships